"An Easier Affair" is the first single from British singer-songwriter George Michael's second greatest hits album, Twenty Five (2006). The song was released on 3 July 2006 and peaked at number one in Italy and Hungary, selling 10,000 units in Italy. In the United Kingdom, it reached number 13. The music video was directed by Jake Nava.

Track listing
CD single and digital single
 "An Easier Affair" – 4:36
 "Brother, Can You Spare a Dime?" (Performed at "Pavarotti and Friends") – 4:27

Charts

Weekly charts

Year-end charts

See also
 List of number-one hits of 2006 (Italy)

References

2006 songs
George Michael songs
LGBT-related songs
Music videos directed by Jake Nava
Number-one singles in Hungary
Number-one singles in Italy
Songs written by George Michael
Song recordings produced by George Michael
Sony BMG singles